Ajayameru is a former village development committee that is now a Rural Municipality in Dadeldhura District in Sudurpashchim Province of western Nepal. It was a Capital of Doti kingdom founded by Niranjan dev in the 11th century.  At the time of the 1991 Nepal census it had a population of 3930 people living in 737 individual households.

References

External links
Google map of the municipalities of  Dadeldhura District

Populated places in Dadeldhura District